Estonian State Publishing House (abbreviation ERK) was a Soviet Estonian state publisher. The publisher existed between 1949 and 1964. Its successor is Eesti Raamat. The headquarter located in Tallinn.

During its existence, it was the most important publisher in Soviet Estonia. In total, the publisher was published about 9000 books and booklets, with total print-run of 80 million.

References

Book publishing companies of Estonia